Fredrik Widmark (born 20 November 1975 in Hässleholm) is a Swedish professional golfer.

A graduate from the U.S. college system where he won five times, Widmark turned professional in 1998 and played predominantly on Europe's second tier Challenge Tour where he won three tournaments. Graduated from the Challenge Tour in 2002 when he finished 14th on the end of season rankings. A 66 (-7) in the final round, the best round of the tournament, gave him his maiden Challenge Tour victory in the 2002 Izki Challenge de España but had to wait until the closing weeks of the season before three more top ten finishes secured his place in the top 20.

After a disappointing 2004, two Challenge Tour victories in 2005, at the Riu Tikida Hotels Moroccan Classic and the Texbond Open, helped him to third place on the final 2005 Rankings and to a career best year-end 189th on the Volvo Order of Merit.

Finished 5th twice on the European Tour, in the 2005 BMW Russian Open and the 2008 Madeira Island Open.

Professional wins (8)

Challenge Tour wins (3)

Challenge Tour playoff record (1–0)

Nordic Golf League wins (4)

Swedish Golf Tour wins (1)

See also

2005 Challenge Tour graduates

References

External links

Fredrik Widmark at golfdata.se 

Swedish male golfers
European Tour golfers
Sportspeople from Skåne County
People from Hässleholm Municipality
1975 births
Living people
20th-century Swedish people